Grant Leadbitter (born 7 January 1986) is an English former professional footballer who played as a midfielder. He made more than 500 appearances in the Premier League and Football League, which included 212 for Middlesbrough, 180 for Sunderland and 116 for Ipswich Town. Leadbitter retired at the end of the 2021 season, having won the EFL Trophy in his final season with Sunderland.

Leadbitter played for Sunderland from 2003 until 2009 after rising as a product from the team's Youth Academy before signing for Ipswich Town. He spent seven seasons with Middlesbrough before finishing his career with Sunderland. In 2007 Leadbitter received a call-up for England U21, and featured for them three times.

Leadbitter is now part of the Middlesbrough academy's coaching staff as an individual development coach.

Early life
Leadbitter was born in Chester-le-Street, County Durham. He grew up in Fence Houses as a Sunderland fan, and joined the Sunderland youth academy at the age of 16. He progressed through the ranks and represented England at the U19 level in 2002, scoring against Brazil to help England finish in the top four in the league tournament.

Club career

Sunderland
Leadbitter's first professional appearance for Sunderland came as a substitute in a League Cup defeat against Huddersfield Town in September 2003. Before obtaining a regular first-team place at the club, he was loaned to Rotherham United in September 2005, where he scored once against Swansea in five league games. After his loan stay in Hibernian, he began to be selected regularly by then manager Mick McCarthy, and played in 11 of Sunderland's final 14 matches of the season.

After Sunderland's relegation in 2006, Leadbitter stalled on contract talks, with many predicting he was aiming to attract the attention of a Premier League club after his impressive displays during the previous season. However, a contract was subsequently agreed with the player claiming he only ever wanted to stay with Sunderland and, henceforth, Leadbitter played an important role in the Black Cats' revival under the management of Roy Keane. Leadbitter took part in every one of Sunderland's games in the 2006–07 season and contributed seven goals, ranking as the club's third top scorer of that season. On Sunderland's return to the Premier League, Leadbitter continued to feature regularly with Keane, even making comparisons with Paul Scholes (he allegedly wears the number 18 shirt in honour of his hero Scholes). In June 2008 Leadbitter signed a new contract with Sunderland, keeping him at the club until 2011.

On 4 October 2008, Leadbitter scored a memorable goal against Arsenal after just coming off the bench. The 25-yard goal was celebrated in emotional style, as he ran over to his manager and had his head on the floor, nearly in tears. This emotional celebration was because his father, Brian Leadbitter, had died just weeks beforehand and his ashes had been buried right on that spot under the grass on the Stadium of Light. "People close to me know why I went down on the floor like I did, I just want to leave it at that. The people who know me know why I kissed that area of the ground. My dad's ashes were buried there. I don't want to go on about it. It just means a lot to me and my family. It's exactly that spot and it was always my intention to do something like that when I scored my first goal here." Leadbitter said to the press after the match.

Ipswich Town
On 1 September 2009, Leadbitter transferred to Championship club Ipswich Town for a fee of £2.6 million, along with team-mate Carlos Edwards. He made his first-appearance on 12 September, starting in a 3–1 loss to Middlesbrough. He scored his first goal for the club against Nottingham Forest on 15 September, netting the opening goal in a 1–1 draw. Leadbitter became a first-team regular during his first season at Portman Road, making 40 appearances in all competitions and scoring 3 goals.

He continued to feature as a regular in the first-team during the 2010–11 season. He scored his first goal of the season on 21 August in a 2–1 away win over Crystal Palace. He made 50 appearances over the course of the season, scoring 6 goals, including a brace in a 3–3 home draw with Middlesbrough at Portman Road.

Leadbitter was named club captain for the 2011–12 season, following the departure of David Norris. On 10 March, he scored a brace as Ipswich came from behind to draw 2–2 with Hull City. Following a spell on the sidelines due to injury, Ipswich manager Paul Jewell gave the captain's armband to Carlos Edwards, who remained as the captain for the remainder of the season. He made 36 appearances during the 2011–12 season, scoring 5 goals.

Middlesbrough
On 29 May 2012, it was announced that Leadbitter had signed a three-year contract with Championship club Middlesbrough, on a free transfer, following the expiry of his contract at Ipswich Town. Leadbitter scored on his debut in a 7–3 pre-season friendly win against Falkirk. He scored his first league goal on 30 November 2012 in a 2–3 away defeat against Birmingham City. Leadbitter scored twice as Boro lost 3–2 away to Wolverhampton Wanderers in March 2013. After a string of consistent performances throughout the 2012–13 season, Leadbitter was awarded Middlesbrough's player of the season in his first season at the club. Leadbitter scored his fourth goal for Middlesbrough on 25 August 2013 at Wigan. On 21 September 2013, he scored Boro's final goal in a 3–3 draw at home to Bournemouth. On 19 December 2014 Leadbitter agreed a 3-year contract extension with the club. Leadbitter's commanding performances and selection of spectacular goals lead to him being named in the Championship PFA Team of the Year.

On 7 May 2016, Leadbitter won promotion to the Premier League with Middlesbrough after a 1–1 draw at home against Brighton & Hove Albion.

Return to Sunderland
Leadbitter re-signed for Sunderland on a free transfer in January 2019. He was named captain at the start of the 2019–20 season. In February 2020, he was given an extended leave of absence from the club for personal reasons, returning for pre-season in July. On 25 May 2021 it was announced that he would leave Sunderland at the end of the season, following the expiry of his contract. On 14 September 2021 Leadbitter announced his retirement from football, most notably winning the EFL trophy with the club in his final season.

International career
Leadbitter came on as a late substitute replacing Gabriel Agbonlahor, in a 2–0 win in England Under 21s 2009 UEFA European Under-21 Championship qualification group, against Bulgaria. He featured again for England U21 on 25 March 2008 and made his final appearance in a 0–0 draw against Poland U21, not being picked after that and turning 23 soon after.

Career statistics

Honours
Sunderland
Football League Championship: 2006–07
EFL Trophy: 2020–21; runner-up: 2018–19

Middlesbrough
Football League Championship runner-up: 2015–16

Individual
Middlesbrough Player of the Year: 2012–13
PFA Team of the Year: 2014–15 Championship

References

External links

1986 births
Living people
Sportspeople from Chester-le-Street
Footballers from County Durham
Footballers from Tyne and Wear
English footballers
England youth international footballers
England under-21 international footballers
Association football midfielders
Sunderland A.F.C. players
Rotherham United F.C. players
Ipswich Town F.C. players
Middlesbrough F.C. players
English Football League players
Premier League players